Acrimony may refer to:
 a feeling of hatred
 Acrimony (band), a rock band
 Acrimony (film), a 2018 film

See also 
 Agrimony, a plant
 Acremonium, a genus of fungi